White River High School is a public secondary school located on an  site just outside Buckley, Washington, United States. Before 1949, it was known as "Buckley High School" but with a merger with "Enumclaw High School" in neighboring Enumclaw, the school became known as White River. In 1952, the voters (especially the Chamber of Commerce) of the City of Enumclaw voted to form their own district.

Facilities
In September 2003, White River moved into a new  facility. The facility was designed by INTEGRUS Architecture and landscape architects Cascade Design Collaborative, Inc.  The design focuses on separating the school into five career path sections—arts and communications, health and human services, business and marketing, science and natural resources, and engineering and technology—for upper classmen and three core class sections for underclassmen. The lunch area is at the center of the school, surrounded by the offices, library, credit union (now defunct) and counseling center.

Awards
 2005 James D. MacConnell Award, recognizing excellence in planning educational facilities that promote student achievement and help serve the needs of the students and faculty, as well as the community. The award is given by the Council of Educational Facilities Planners International (CEFPI).
 2005 Civil Design Merit Award from the Washington State AIA, which recognized public projects with great civic design.

Activities
Clubs at the school are: 

 ASB
 Band
 Choir (Mixed, Chamber, and Show)
 DECA
 Diversity Club
 Drama Club
 FBLA
 FCCLA
 FFA
 Key Club
 Knowledge Bowl
 National Honor Society
 Native American Club
 SADD
 TSA
 WRSAW

Athletics
In 2006, White River joined the newly formed 3A South Puget Sound League. 

Sports:

 Baseball
 Basketball [Boys']
 Basketball [Girls']
 Cross Country
 Fastpitch
 Football
 Golf
 Soccer [Boys']
 Soccer [Girls']
 Special Olympics
 Tennis [Boys']
 Tennis [Girls']
 Track
 Volleyball
 Wrestling [Boys']
 Wrestling [Girls']

Notable alumni
 Will Jacobsen, professional basketball player

References

External links
 White River School District
 School website
 Greatschools.org

High schools in Pierce County, Washington
South Puget Sound League
Public high schools in Washington (state)
1908 establishments in Washington (state)